The Annual Shogi Awards (将棋大賞 shōgi taishō) are a number of prizes awarded yearly by the Japan Shogi Association to professional and amateur shogi players who have achieved particular success. The first Annual Shogi Awards were presented in 1974.

Winners
Below is a table of the awards given and the award winners for each year.

Kōzō Masuda Awards

The Kōzō Masuda Award (升田幸三賞 Masuda Kōzō shō) and the Kōzō Masuda Special Prize (升田幸三賞特別賞 Masuda Kōzō shō takubetsu shō) are two prizes awarded to professional or amateur players who have made an outstanding contribution to the development and evolution of shogi openings by way of innovation or excellence in shogi theory or tactics. The awards are named after the innovative player, Kōzō Masuda. The Masuda Award is given out yearly since 1995 while the Masuda Special Prize is awarded infrequently.

Winners

Masuda Award
 1995 (22nd Annual Shogi Awards) Kunio Naitō for the Side Pawn Capture, Bishop-33 variations. 
 1996 (23rd Annual Shogi Awards) Makoto Nakahara for the Nakahara variation of Side Pawn Capture and the Nakahara castle.
 1997 (24th Annual Shogi Awards) Takeshi Fujii for the Fujii System.
 1998 (25th Annual Shogi Awards) Teruichi Aono for the Saginomiya joseki. 
 1999 (26th Annual Shogi Awards) Makoto Chūza for the Side Pawn Capture, Chūza's Rook. 
 2000 (27th Annual Shogi Awards) Kunio Yonenaga for the Yonenaga King. 
 2001 (28th Annual Shogi Awards) Hiroyuki Miura for the Millenium castle.
 2002 (29th Annual Shogi Awards) Masakazu Kondō for the Cheerful Central Rook. 
 2003 (30th Annual Shogi Awards) Kōichi Kodama for the Crab Silvers. 
 2004 (31st Annual Shogi Awards) Kōji Tanigawa for his ...S-77+ move in his A-class Ranking Match against Akira Shima.
 2005 (32nd Annual Shogi Awards) Daisuke Suzuki for the New Quick Ishida (4. P-7d). 
 2006 (33rd Annual Shogi Awards) Hitoshige Awaji for the Tempo Loss Bishop Exchange. 
 2007 (34th Annual Shogi Awards) Yasumitsu Satō for the ambition and variety of moves in Direct Opposing Rook. 
 2008 (35th Annual Shogi Awards) Kenji Imaizumi for the 1... R-32 opening. 
 2009 (36th Annual Shogi Awards) Toshiaki Kubo for his 6. R-7e move in the 2nd. match against Yasumitsu Satō for the 34th Kiō title.
 2010 (37th Annual Shogi Awards) Eiji Iijima for the Iijima Bishop Pullback. 
 2011 (38th Annual Shogi Awards) Yoshitaka Hoshino for the Super High Speed Silver-37 strategy. 
 2012 (39th Annual Shogi Awards) Yasumitsu Satō for the move 13. K-57 in his first game against Toshiaki Kubo for the Ōshō title.
 2013 (40th Annual Shogi Awards) Takeshi Fujii for the Bishop Exchange Fourth File Rook.
 2014 (41st Annual Shogi Awards) Ayumu Matsuo for the ...K-52 variation of Side Pawn Capture.
 2015 (42nd Annual Shogi Awards) Tatsuya Sugai for his many tactical variations against Central Rook Anaguma, Cheerful Central Rook, Quick Ishida and others. 
 2016 (43rd Annual Shogi Awards) Eisaku Tomioka for the Tomioka variation of Bishop Exchange, Reclining Silver.
 2017 (44th Annual Shogi Awards) Shōta Chida for the Bishop Exchange, Reclining Silver variations K-42/G-62/R-81. 
 2018 (45th Annual Shogi Awards) Teruichi Aono for the Aono Side Pawn Capture, and Yūki Sasaki for the Yūki Side Pawn Capture .
2019 (46th Annual Shogi Awards) Sōta Fujii for the move 38. ... Rx7g+ in the final match of the 5th class of the 31st Ryūō Ranking tournament against Naohiro Ishida on June 5, 2018.
2020 (47th Annual Shogi Awards) The shogi engine elmo for developing the "elmo castle".
2021 (48th Annual Shogi Awards) Takahiro Ōhashi for the Yōryū Fourth File Rook
2022 (49th Annual Shogi Awards) Shōta Chida for the Bishop Exchange Gold-33 Quick Silver Attack

Masuda Special Prize
 2003 Katsumi Tateishi for the Tateishi Fourth File Rook. 
 2005 Taku Morishita for the Morishita System. 
 2007 Kazuo Manabe for his splendid, phantom ...*B-42 move in his (last) match against Masayuki Toyoshima.
 2011 Takayuki Yamasaki for the New Yamasaki variation of Side Pawn Capture.
 2014 Yasuaki Tsukada for the Tsukada Special developed in the mid 1980s.
 2016 Hifumi Katō for his developments and many novel contributions for Climbing Silver over his 62-year career.
 2017 Nobuyuki Ōuchi for his many developments in the strategy for Bear-in-the-hole Ranging Rook.
2018 Tadahisa Maruyama for his research on Bishop Exchange opening including Tempo Loss Bishop Exchange.
2019 Kenji Waki for the Waki System.
2020 Sōta Fujii for the move 58...S*31 in Game 2 of the 91st Kisei title match.
2022 Torahiko Tanaka for his developments in opening strategy for Static Rook Anaguma and Yagura Without Pushing the Rook Pawn among others.

References

1974 establishments in Japan
Shogi
Japanese awards